Tisha Michelle Campbell (born October 13, 1968) is an American actress and singer. She made her screen debut appearing in the 1986 rock musical comedy film Little Shop of Horrors, and later starred on the short-lived NBC musical comedy drama Rags to Riches (1987–1988).

Campbell has appeared in films including School Daze (1988), Rooftops (1989), Another 48 Hrs. (1990), Boomerang (1992), and Sprung (1997). She received Independent Spirit Award for Best Supporting Female nomination for her performance in the 1990 comedy film House Party, and later starred in its two sequels House Party 2 (1991) and House Party 3 (1994).

On television, Campbell starred as Gina Waters-Payne in the Fox comedy series Martin from 1992 to 1997, and as Janet "Jay" Marie Johnson-Kyle in the ABC comedy series My Wife and Kids (2001–2005), for which she received NAACP Image Award for Outstanding Actress in a Comedy Series. She later had regular roles on Rita Rocks (Lifetime, 2008–2009), The Protector (Lifetime, 2011), Dr. Ken (ABC, 2015–2017), Outmatched (Fox, 2020) and Uncoupled (Netflix, 2022).

Early life
Campbell was born in Oklahoma City, Oklahoma, and raised in Newark, New Jersey, where she attended Newark Arts High School and also East Orange, New Jersey, where she attended Washington Academy of Music. Her mother, Mona (née Raye) Shockley (now known as Mona Washington), was a nurse, talent manager, gospel singer, and vocal coach. Her father, Clifton Campbell, was a factory worker and singer, and as a chess master, works with underprivileged children. Her parents encouraged her love for music.

Campbell has an older brother, three younger brothers, and a younger sister.

During a 2014 appearance on the daytime talk show The Daily Helpline, Campbell said that she was raped at age three by a male family friend who was baby-sitting her at the time.

Career

Acting
Campbell's first television appearance was at the age of six, in an episode in 1974 of the PBS show The Big Blue Marble. As a child, she won many talent shows, going on to appear in such children's programs as Kids Are People Too, Unicorn Tales (played lead Daisy Bunsen in episode, The Magnificent Major), and Captain Kangaroo. At age 17, she performed in the musical feature film, Little Shop of Horrors as Chiffon, one of The Supremes-like girl group Greek Chorus, along with future Martin co-star & best friend, Tichina Arnold.

After graduating from the Arts High School in Newark, she moved to Hollywood, where she became a star on the short lived NBC musical comedy-drama series, Rags to Riches (1987–88). She later starred in the musical comedy drama film School Daze, directed by Spike Lee, as Jane Toussaint.

In 1989, Campbell costarred in the crime film Rooftops, and the following year starred alongside Eddie Murphy in the action comedy Another 48 Hrs.. She later appeared in an supporting role in the 1992 romantic comedy Boomerang, also starring Murphy. Her most notable film credit is 1990 comedy House Party for which she received Independent Spirit Award for Best Supporting Female nomination. She later co starred in its two sequels; House Party 2 (1991), and House Party 3 (1994). In 1997, she received her star billed role in the Trimark Pictures' comedy film Sprung. She later had the leading role in the independent drama film The Last Place on Earth (2002), and appeared in Kevin Smith's sex comedy film Zack and Miri Make a Porno (2008) playing the acerbic wife of Craig Robinson's character.

In 1992, Campbell was cast as Regina "Gina" Waters-Payne in the Fox comedy series Martin. She left the show in April 1997, after settling the lawsuit against Martin Lawrence of sexual harassment. The following year, she starred opposite Diahann Carroll in the Hallmark Hall of Fame film The Sweetest Gift (1998). Campbell returned to television in 2001, starring opposite Damon Wayans in the ABC comedy series My Wife and Kids. The series ran for five seasons, until 2005. In 2003, she won NAACP Image Award for Outstanding Actress in a Comedy Series for her role.

After My Wife and Kids, Campbell was a regular in the Lifetime comedy series Rita Rocks (2008–09). In 2011, she starred opposite Ally Walker in the Lifetime police drama The Protector. The series was canceled after a single season. In September 2015, she was cast in the ABC sitcom Dr. Ken, starring Ken Jeong. The series was cancelled after two seasons in 2017. In the beginning of 2018, she played Olympic gymnast Simone Biles' mother in the Lifetime movie The Simone Biles Story: Courage to Soar. Later in 2018, Campbell starred on the ABC drama pilot The Holmes Sisters about the lives of five African-American sisters, all officers in the NYPD. It was produced by Regina King and Robin Roberts.

Music
In 1993, Campbell released her debut album, Tisha, which was a moderate success, selling 40,000 copies. Two singles received minor airplay on the R&B stations: "Push", which was co written and produced by Campbell's' friend, Vanilla Ice, and "Love Me Down". Campbell contributed vocals for the soundtrack of the 1997 film, Sprung, in which she starred, singing a cover version of "Don't Ask My Neighbor" with her Martin costar Tichina Arnold.

She appeared in several music videos in the 1990s and 2000s, including two for Will Smith ("Will 2K" and "Wild Wild West") and one for Toni Braxton ("You're Makin' Me High"). In 2012, Campbell starred in Mindless Behavior's music video for "Hello".

On September 21, 2015, she released the single, "Steel Here". On February 24, 2016, Campbell released the single, "Lazy Bitch", as well as an accompanying video, where she featured her friend, Tasha Smith. On February 2, 2018, Campbell released the single, "I Don't Wanna Be Alone Tonight". On October 6, 2019, Campbell released the single, "22 Summers," with an accompanying video.

Philanthropy
In 2011, Campbell co-founded Colored My Mind, a non-profit foundation dedicated to raising awareness of childhood autism in communities of color. She was inspired to start the organization by her son Xen, who was diagnosed with autism when he was 18 months old.

Personal life
On August 17, 1996, Campbell married actor Duane Martin. The couple have two sons, Xen Martin (born August 8, 2001) and Ezekiel Czar Martin (born September 8, 2009). In February 2018, Campbell filed for divorce after 21 years of marriage. They finalized their divorce in December 2020.

In November 1996, Campbell left the Fox series Martin during its final season, citing "intolerable" working conditions. In January 1997, Campbell filed a lawsuit against co-star Martin Lawrence on the counts of sexual harassment and abuse both on and off set. By April 1997, Campbell had settled the lawsuit, and returned to appear in the last two episodes of the series.

Campbell and Lawrence have both said that they have reconciled. In an Instagram post on January 17, 2020, Lawrence wrote, "Regardless of the past or any misrepresentation of it In the press, I have nothin' but love for Tisha then and now. We are good and always will be! #teammartymar #yougogirl." Campbell responded in the post's comment section, "YOU GO BOY My fam fo life!"

Discography

Studio albums
 Tisha (1993)

Filmography

Film

Television

Awards and nominations

References

External links
 

1968 births
Living people
20th-century American actresses
21st-century American actresses
African-American actresses
American child actresses
American film actresses
Capitol Records artists
American television actresses
20th-century African-American women singers
Actresses from Newark, New Jersey
Actresses from Oklahoma City
Musicians from Newark, New Jersey
Musicians from Oklahoma City
Newark Arts High School alumni
Singers from New York (state)
Singers from Oklahoma
African-American child actresses
American contemporary R&B singers
21st-century American women singers
21st-century American singers
21st-century African-American women singers